"Megatron Man" is a 1981 dance single by producer Patrick Cowley, released by Megatone Records. It charted at #2 on the Billboard Hot Dance Music/Club Play chart in 1981 and was the first track on his second album, Megatron Man, issued the same year.

Notes
Per the bonus material in The Return of Mister X (1987), the man pictured in the art is comic book character Mister X.

References

1981 singles
1981 songs
Songs written by Patrick Cowley